David Kizzia (born February 15, 1972) is an American politician and a Democratic member of the Arkansas House of Representatives from District 26 from 2013 to 2015. He was succeeded by the Republican Laurie Rushing.

Education
Kizzia earned his Bachelor of Arts in religion from Oklahoma Baptist University, his M.Div. from the New Orleans Baptist Theological Seminary, and his JD from the University of Arkansas at Little Rock's William H. Bowen School of Law.

Elections
2012 To challenge District 26 incumbent Republican Representative Loy Mauch, Kizzia won the May 22, 2012 Democratic Primary with 1,592 votes (60.6%), and won the November 6, 2012 General election with 5,589 votes (54.7%) against Representative Mauch.

References

External links
Official page at the Arkansas House of Representatives
Campaign site

David Kizzia at Ballotpedia
David Kizzia at the National Institute on Money in State Politics

Place of birth missing (living people)
1972 births
Living people
Arkansas lawyers
Democratic Party members of the Arkansas House of Representatives
New Orleans Baptist Theological Seminary alumni
Oklahoma Baptist University alumni
People from Malvern, Arkansas
William H. Bowen School of Law alumni